Duncan McDonald may refer to:
Duncan McDonald (Scottish footballer), Scottish footballer for Woolwich Arsenal
Duncan McDonald (English footballer), English footballer for Crewe Alexandra
Duncan McDonald (Nova Scotia politician) (1839–1903), merchant and political figure in Nova Scotia
Duncan McDonald (industrialist) (1921–1997), Scottish industrialist

See also
Duncan MacDonald (disambiguation)